Crane Township, Ohio, may refer to:

Crane Township, Paulding County, Ohio
Crane Township, Wyandot County, Ohio

Ohio township disambiguation pages